Cymothoe amaniensis is a butterfly in the family Nymphalidae. It is found in north-eastern Tanzania. The habitat consists of sub-montane forest at altitudes between 900 and 1,200 meters.

The larvae probably feed on Rawsonia usambarensis.

References

Butterflies described in 1980
Cymothoe (butterfly)
Endemic fauna of Tanzania
Butterflies of Africa